Mariia Pavlova (Russian: Мария Павлова, born 24 October 1998) is a Russian Paralympic swimmer. She represented Russian Paralympic Committee athletes at the 2020 Summer Paralympics.

Career
Mariia Pavlova took up swimming aged six, in Moscow. She represented Russian Paralympic Committee athletes at the 2020 Summer Paralympics in the women's 200 metre individual medley SM8 event and won a bronze medal.

References

1998 births
Living people
Swimmers from Moscow
Russian female freestyle swimmers
Paralympic swimmers of Russia
Medalists at the World Para Swimming Championships
Medalists at the World Para Swimming European Championships
Swimmers at the 2020 Summer Paralympics
Medalists at the 2020 Summer Paralympics
Paralympic medalists in swimming
Paralympic gold medalists for the Russian Paralympic Committee athletes
Paralympic bronze medalists for the Russian Paralympic Committee athletes
Russian female breaststroke swimmers
Russian female medley swimmers
S8-classified Paralympic swimmers
20th-century Russian women
21st-century Russian women